Gregan is a surname. Notable people with the surname include:

Brian Gregan (born 1989), Irish sprinter
Eugene Gregan (born 1937), American painter
George Gregan (born 1973), Australian rugby union player
John Edgar Gregan (1813–1855), Scottish architect
Miroslav Gregáň (1996), Slovak footballer
Sean Gregan (born 1974), English footballer

See also
Gregan McMahon (1874–1941), Australian actor and theatrical producer
Grogan